Tarrafal de São Nicolau is a concelho (municipality) of Cape Verde. Situated in the western part of the island of São Nicolau, it covers 35% of the island area (119.8 km²) and is home to 41% of its population (5,237 at the 2010 census). Its seat is the town Tarrafal de São Nicolau.

Subdivisions
The municipality consists of one freguesia (civil parish), São Francisco de Assis. The freguesia is subdivided into the following settlements (population at the 2010 census):

Cabeçalinho (pop: 155)
Fragata (pop: 172)
Hortelã (pop: 181)
Palhal (pop: 100)
Praia Branca (pop: 521, town)
Ribeira dos Calhaus 
Ribeira Prata (pop: 343)
Tarrafal de São Nicolau (pop: 3,733, city)

History

The municipality was created in 2005, when the older municipality of São Nicolau was split in two, the western part becoming the Municipality of Tarrafal de São Nicolau and the eastern part becoming the Municipality of Ribeira Brava.

Demography

Politics
Since 2012, the Movement for Democracy (MpD) is the ruling party of the municipality. The results of the latest elections, in 2016:

Twin town

Tarrafal de São Nicolau is twinned with:
 Fiuggi

References 

 
Municipalities of Cape Verde
Geography of São Nicolau, Cape Verde
2005 establishments in Cape Verde